Protein-ribulosamine 3-kinase (FN3KRP, FN3K-related protein, FN3K-RP, ketosamine 3-kinase 2, fructosamine-3-kinase-related protein, ribulosamine/erythrulosamine 3-kinase, ribulosamine 3-kinase) is an enzyme with systematic name ATP:(protein)-N6-D-ribulosyl-L-lysine 3-phosphotransferase. This enzyme catalyses the following chemical reaction

 ATP + [protein]-N6-D-ribulosyl-L-lysine  ADP + [protein]-N6-(3-O-phospho-D-ribulosyl)-L-lysine

This enzyme takes part in freeing proteins from ribulosamines or psicosamines.

References

External links 
 

EC 2.7.1